Taavi Vartiainen (born 30 June 1994) is a Finnish former professional ice hockey player. He played with Lahti Pelicans and Ilves in the Finnish Liiga.

Vartiainen made his Liiga debut playing with Lahti Pelicans during the 2014–15 Liiga season.

References

External links

1994 births
Living people
Finnish ice hockey forwards
Ilves players
KOOVEE players
Lahti Pelicans players
Sportspeople from Lahti